Events from the year 1987 in the United Kingdom.

The major political event of this year is the re-election of Margaret Thatcher in June's general election, making her the longest continuously-serving Prime Minister of the United Kingdom since Lord Liverpool in the early 19th century. The year is also marked by six disasters: the 1987 United Kingdom and Ireland cold wave, the sinking of the ferry , the Hungerford massacre, the "Great Storm", the Remembrance Day bombing and the King's Cross fire.

Incumbents
 Monarch – Elizabeth II
 Prime Minister – Margaret Thatcher (Conservative)
 Parliament
 49th (until 18 May)
 50th (starting 17 June)

Events

January
 January – 1987 United Kingdom and Ireland cold wave: Most of Britain is affected by heavy snow and sub-zero temperatures.
 1 January – Personal equity plans permitting tax-free investments in shares are introduced.
 2 January – Golliwogs in Enid Blyton books are replaced by the publisher with gnomes following complaints that golliwogs are offensive to Black people.
 4 January – Economists predict that unemployment will fall below the 3,000,000 mark by the end of this year.
 5 January – Harold Macmillan, Lord Stockton, former Prime Minister, is buried in the village of Horsted Keynes, having died on 29 December at the age of 92.
 7 January – Telford, the new town created in Shropshire some 20 years ago, is reported to have the highest unemployment rate in the West Midlands region, eclipsing the unemployment levels seen in the city of Birmingham and nearby towns including Wolverhampton, Brierley Hill, Wednesbury and Bilston, which have lost a large percentage of traditional heavy industry since the late-1970s, although Brierley Hill's unemployment crisis is beginning to ease with the ongoing development of the Merry Hill Shopping Centre, which already includes two retail parks and a large shopping mall and is set to expand even further by the end of the decade.
 13 January – Prince Edward leaves the Royal Marines just three months after joining.
 14 January – 1987 United Kingdom and Ireland cold wave: Heavy snow falls across Britain leaving houses, towns, roads, railways and motor vehicles stranded and blocked.
 15 January – Unemployment is reported to have fallen in December 1986 for the fifth month in succession.
 20 January
 Terry Waite, the special envoy of the Archbishop of Canterbury in Lebanon, disappears in Beirut whilst negotiating for the release of hostages; he will himself remain a hostage until 1991.
 Police arrest 26 suspected football hooligans across Britain after a mass operation.
 30 January – The flotation of British Airways on the stock market begins.

February
 February – Ford launches a facelifted Sierra range which now includes a saloon model called the Sapphire. 
 11 February
 British Airways is privatised and listed on the London Stock Exchange.
 Cynthia Payne is acquitted of controlling prostitutes in her London home.
 12 February – Edwina Currie sparks controversy by stating that "good Christians won't get AIDS".
 24 February – It is alleged that six Nazi war criminals are living in the UK.
 26 February
 Church of England's General Synod votes to allow the ordination of women.
 Rosie Barnes wins the Greenwich parliamentary seat for the Social Democratic Party (SDP) from Labour at a by-election.

March
 3 March – National Health Service prescription charges are increased from £2.20 to £2.40.
 6 March
 British Channel ferry  capsizes while leaving the harbour of Zeebrugge, Belgium, killing 193 on board.
 The value of the pound is at a five-year high.
 13 March – 25-year-old Matthew Taylor retains Truro for the Liberals at the by-election caused by the death of David Penhaligon three months ago.
 19 March – Winston Silcott is sentenced to life imprisonment for the murder of PC Keith Blakelock in the Tottenham riots 17 months ago.
 23 March – 31 people are injured when a suspected Provisional Irish Republican Army (IRA) bomb explodes at a British army barracks in Rheindahlen, West Germany.
 27 March – Leader of the Opposition Neil Kinnock meets U.S President Ronald Reagan in Washington, D.C.
 29 March – Prime Minister Margaret Thatcher visits Moscow.
 30 March – Christie's auction house in London sells one of Vincent van Gogh's iconic Sunflowers paintings for £24,750,000.

April
 1 April – MPs vote against the restoration of the death penalty by 342–230.
 3 April – The jewellery of the late Duchess of Windsor is sold at auction for £31,000,000 six times the expected value.
 5 April – Arsenal win the Football League Cup for the first time in their history with a 2–1 win over Liverpool, earning them their first major trophy since 1979. Charlie Nicholas scores both of Arsenal's goals.
 9 April – The Broderip Ward, the first hospital ward dedicated to the treatment of people with HIV/AIDS in the United Kingdom is opened by Diana, Princess of Wales at the Middlesex Hospital in London.
 16 April – Conservative MP Harvey Proctor appears in court charged with gross indecency.
 22 April – Former Prime Minister James Callaghan is appointed to the Order of the Garter. He will be retiring from Parliament at this year's general election.
 29 April – Chancellor Nigel Lawson promises that the UK will soon have an income tax rate of 25p in the pound.
 30 April – The House of Lords acting in a judicial capacity approves the sterilisation of a "mentally subnormal" 17-year-old female.

May
 4 May – Everton win the Football League First Division title for the ninth time in their history.
 8 May – Loughgall ambush: Soldiers of the SAS kill eight members of the Provisional Irish Republican Army at Loughgall, County Antrim.
 10 May – The church of St Mary-at-Hill in the City of London is damaged in a fire.
 11 May
 Margaret Thatcher calls a general election for Thursday, 11 June; with most of the opinion polls pointing towards her securing a third successive election victory for the Conservatives, with the Labour opposition expected to increase its share of votes and seat tally at its first general election under the leadership of Neil Kinnock.
 British Rail renames Second class travel as Standard class.
 14 May – Unemployment has fallen to 3,107,128.
 15 May – Family Law Reform Act removes remaining legal distinctions between children born to married and unmarried parents.
 16 May – Coventry City F.C. win the FA Cup for the first time in their history with a 3–2 win in the final over Tottenham Hotspur, who have won all of their previous seven FA Cup finals.
 25 May – Aldershot F.C. become the first team to win promotion through the new Football League playoffs, winning promotion from the Fourth Division with a 3–0 aggregate win over Wolverhampton Wanderers (who have a total of eight major trophies to their name, the most recent seven years ago). The Hampshire club have already condemned another side, Bolton Wanderers (four times FA Cup winners) to relegation to the Fourth Division for the first time in their history.

June
 3 June – The last MORI poll before the general election shows the Conservatives 11 points ahead of Labour with 43% of the vote, while the Liberal/SDP Alliance's support stands at 24% and their hopes of building on their result at the last general election look exceedingly slim.
 7 June – Chessington Zoo is renamed Chessington World of Adventures and made into a theme park by owner Madame Tussaud's.
 11 June – The 1987 general election sees Margaret Thatcher secure her third term in office as Prime Minister of the United Kingdom. Her parliamentary majority is reduced to 102 compared to the 144-seat majority gained at the election four years earlier, but will still not be exceeded by the Conservative Party as of 2019. High-profile casualties of the election include: the former SDP leader Roy Jenkins (once a Labour Home Secretary) and the Ulster Unionist Party's 75-year-old Enoch Powell (a former Conservative MP). Four ethnic minority candidates are successful: Diane Abbott, Paul Boateng, Bernie Grant and Keith Vaz. Among the MPs retiring from parliament is 75-year-old James Callaghan, the former Prime Minister.
 18 June – Unemployment has fallen below the 3,000,000 mark for the first time since 1981, after the biggest monthly fall in unemployment since records began in 1948; seeing more than 100,000 of the unemployed find work in May.
 19 June – Howard Kendall, manager of Football League champions Everton, resigns to take over of Athletic Club Bilbao in Spain. His successor at Everton is the club's assistant manager Colin Harvey.
 22 June – A riot takes place in Chapeltown, Leeds.
 25 June – A MORI poll shows support for the Conservative Party stands at almost 50% – the highest during Margaret Thatcher's time as leader.
 27 June – 25 years after the first James Bond film was released, the fifteenth, The Living Daylights, premieres in London, with the spy now being played by Timothy Dalton.
 30 June – Footballer Peter Beardsley, the 26-year-old England striker, becomes the most expensive player transferred between British clubs when he completes a £1,900,000 move from Newcastle United to Liverpool.

July
 12 July – £60,000,000 is stolen during the Knightsbridge Security Deposit robbery.
 16 July
 British Airways and British Caledonian agree a £237,000,000 merger.
 Unemployment is reported to be down to just over 2,900,000.
 22 July – Palestinian cartoonist Naji al-Ali is shot in London; his condition is described as "critical".
 24 July – Novelist and former Conservative MP Jeffrey Archer wins a libel case against the Daily Star newspaper over allegations that he was involved in a vice ring. In 2001 he will be convicted and imprisoned for perjury in connection with this case.
 27 July – Rick Astley's "Never Gonna Give You Up" is released, the first of eight of his singles to reach the Top 10 in the UK.
 29 July – The Channel Tunnel is given the go-ahead after Margaret Thatcher and François Mitterrand ratify the Treaty of Canterbury. It is expected to be open within six years and in fact opens in 1994.
 30 July – The Docklands Light Railway in London, the first driverless railway in Great Britain, is opened by The Queen; passenger service will begin a month later.
 31 July – The Attorney General institutes legal proceedings against The Daily Telegraph to prevent it publishing details from the book Spycatcher on security grounds.

August
 4 August – Just months after confessing to a further two murders, the Moors Murderer Ian Brady claims that he committed a further five murders.
 6 August – Dr. David Owen resigns as Leader of the Social Democratic Party after its members vote to merge with the Liberals.
 10 August – One person a day in Britain is now reported to be dying of AIDS.
 13 August
 First building of post-war design to be Listed: Bracken House in the City of London, designed by Sir Albert Richardson as the Financial Times headquarters (1955–9).
 Unemployment continues to fall, with the twelfth successive monthly fall bringing the national total to less than 2,900,000.
 19 August
 Hungerford massacre: Michael Ryan shoots dead fourteen people in the Berkshire town of Hungerford (with weapons including semi-automatic rifles) before taking his own life. 16 people are injured, some of them seriously. On 21 August the death toll rises to 16 when two more victims die in hospital from their injuries.
 The Order of the Garter is opened to women.
 27 August – Robert Maclennan replaces David Owen as Leader of the Social Democratic Party.
 29 August – Naji al-Ali dies in hospital more than five weeks after being shot.
 30 August – David Owen forms a breakaway faction of the SDP.

September
 7 September – Ford completes its takeover of the luxury sports car company Aston Martin.
 9 September – 25 Liverpool football fans are extradited to Belgium to face charges of manslaughter in connection with the Heysel Stadium disaster more than two years ago.
 11 September – The Government announces plans to abolish the Inner London Education Authority.
 22 September – The Government bans automatic weapons of the type used in the Hungerford massacre.
 23 September – An Australian court lifts the ban on the publication of Spycatcher.

October
 October – Construction work begins on the extension to the M40 motorway between Oxford and Birmingham. It is hoped that the motorway, providing an alternative route to the M6 and M1 from the Midlands to London as well as improving road links with the Midlands and the South Coast ports, will be fully operational by 1990.
 1 October – Swedish home product retailer IKEA opens its first British store at Warrington in Cheshire.
 9 October – Margaret Thatcher tells the Conservative Party Conference in Blackpool that she wants to continue as Prime Minister until 1994 and the age of 69, which would make her Britain's oldest Prime Minister since Harold Macmillan in 1963. She is already three months away from becoming Britain's longest-serving Prime Minister this century, exceeding the previous record set by H. H. Asquith of the Liberal Party more than 70 years ago, but will be forced by her party to resign in 1990. 
 11 October – £1,000,000 Operation Deepscan in Loch Ness fails to locate the legendary Loch Ness Monster.
 15–16 October – Great storm: Hurricane force winds batter much of south-east England, killing 23 people and causing extensive damage to property. Two days after the end of the storm, some 250,000 homes in the region will still be without electricity.
 19 October
 Black Monday: Wall Street crash leads to £50,000,000,000 being wiped of the value of shares on the London stock exchange.
 Glanrhyd Bridge collapse: A train runs off the end of a bridge that has collapsed into the River Towy in Wales due to flooding, killing four people. 
 23 October – Retired English jockey Lester Piggott is jailed for three years after being convicted of tax evasion.
 25 October – Peugeot begins production of its second car, the 405 four-door saloon at the Ryton plant near Coventry. The first customers are set to take delivery of their cars after Christmas. A French-built estate version will be launched next year.

November
 November – The first acid house raves are reported in the United Kingdom, many of them being in derelict buildings.
1 November – British Rail establishes a world speed record for diesel traction, 148.4 mph (238.9 km/h) with a test InterCity 125 formation between Darlington and York.
 2 November – Peter Brooke succeeds Norman Tebbit as Chairman of the Conservative Party.
 3 November – It is announced that unemployment in Britain fell quicker during October than in any other European country.
 5 November – London City Airport opens.
 8 November – Enniskillen bombing: Eleven people are killed by a Provisional Irish Republican Army bomb at a Remembrance Day service in Enniskillen.
 11 November – Customs officers in Southampton seize more than £50,000,000 worth of cocaine – the most expensive haul of the drug ever found in the UK.
 12 November – Unemployment has fallen to 2,700,000 (just under 10% of the workforce), the lowest level of unemployment recorded in Britain for over six years.
 17 November
 The Government announces that the Poll tax (community charge) to fund local government will be introduced in England and Wales in April 1990.
 Fireman Sam, a children's television series about a fireman voiced and narrated by John Alderton, debuts on BBC1.
 18 November – King's Cross fire: A fire on an escalator at King's Cross station on the London Underground kills 31 people.
 19 November – Conservative support has reached 50% in a MORI poll for the first time.
 24 November – The Government announces that eye tests will no longer be provided free of charge by the National Health Service.

December
 December – The British-built Peugeot 405 wins the European Car of the Year award, the first Peugeot to be given the title for nearly 20 years. British sales begin in the new year, several months after it was launched in France.
 9 December – The England cricket team's tour of Pakistan is nearly brought to a premature end when captain Mike Gatting and umpire Shakoor Rana row during a Test Match.
 15 December – Channel Tunnel construction is initiated, and it is expected to open in 1993 or early-1994 (in the event, it will be mid to late 1994).
 17 December – A year that has seen an excellent performance for the British economy ends with unemployment reported to have fallen below the 2,700,000 mark; having started the year in excess of 3,000,000.
 25 December – ITV enjoys a record breaking audience when more than 26,000,000 viewers tune in for the Christmas Day episode of Coronation Street, in which Hilda Ogden (Jean Alexander) makes her final appearance on the show after 23 years.
 29 December – The Kylie Minogue single "I Should Be So Lucky" is released by PWL. Australian Minogue, 19, of maternal Welsh heritage, is already hugely popular with British audiences for her role in the TV soap Neighbours which debuted on the BBC fourteen months ago.
 31 December – 31 British and Belgian people are recognised in the New Year Honours for heroism shown in the rescue operation at the Zeebrugge Disaster earlier in the year.

Undated
 Inflation remains low for the sixth year running, standing at 4.2% for 1987.
 Largest ever deficit to date on UK balance of payments.
 With overall unemployment falling below 3,000,000, youth unemployment is now below the 1,000,000 mark.
 Overall economy growth for the year reaches 5.5% – the highest since 1963.

Publications
 London Daily News, short-lived newspaper (24 February – 23 July)
 Iain M. Banks' novel Consider Phlebas.
 Iain Banks' novel Espedair Street.
 William Golding's novel Close Quarters, second of the To the Ends of the Earth trilogy.
 Paul Kennedy's historical study The Rise and Fall of the Great Powers.
 Penelope Lively's novel Moon Tiger.
 Ian McEwan's novel The Child in Time.
 Terry Pratchett's Discworld novels Equal Rites and Mort.

Births
 6 January – Gemma Gibbons, judoka
 8 January – Freddie Stroma, actor
 9 January
Sam Bird, racing driver
Paolo Nutini, Scottish pop-rock singer-songwriter
 23 January – Michael Christie, Scottish field hockey defender
 27 January – Lily Donaldson, model
 28 January – Misha Crosby, actor
 30 January – Phil Lester, Youtuber and radio presenter
 31 January – Marcus Mumford, folk rock singer-songwriter (Mumford & Sons)
 7 February – Joe Cardle, footballer
 8 February – Chris Erskine, Scottish footballer 
 9 February – Rose Leslie, Scottish actress 
 14 February – Scott Dann, footballer 
 15 February – Alex Rodman, footballer
 22 February – Shaun Batt, footballer
 27 February – Scott Davies, footballer
 4 March – Tamzin Merchant, actress
 6 March – Hannah Taylor-Gordon, actress 
 12 March – Chris Stark, radio DJ
 27 March – Zaraah Abrahams, actress
 2 April
Marc Pugh, footballer
 Molly Smitten-Downes, singer-songwriter
 3 April – Benjamin Stone, actor
 11 April – Joss Stone, soul singer
 16 April – Aaron Lennon, English footballer  
 21 April – Sophie Rundle, actress 
 27 April – William Moseley, actor
 28 April – Bradley Johnson, footballer
 1 May – Matt Di Angelo, actor
 5 May – Jessie Cave, actress 
 7 May – Mark Reynolds, footballer
 8 May – Mark Noble, footballer
 9 May – Dan Cole, rugby union player
 12 May – David Foley, English footballer
 15 May – Sir Andy Murray, Scottish tennis player
 20 May – Fra Fee, Northern Irish actor and singer  
 28 May – Liam Shotton, footballer
 3 June – Michelle Keegan, actress 
 4 June 
 Mollie King, pop singer-songwriter
 Luisa Zissman, TV personality
 5 June – Charlie Clements, actor
 9 June – James Maynard, mathematician  
 11 June – Dappy, rapper
 18 June – Moeen Ali, cricketer
 24 June
 Josh Lillis, footballer
 Nicholas Robinson-Baker, diver
 27 June
 Ed Westwick, actor
 India de Beaufort, actress
 1 July 
 Scott Benton, politician
 John Hathaway, mixed martial artist
 6 July – Kate Nash, indie pop singer-songwriter
 7 July – Carly Telford, England footballer
 10 July – Amy Oliver, archer
 29 July – Alice Dellal, model
 1 August – Karen Carney, football player and journalist
 4 August 
 Jon Lilygreen, Welsh singer
 Sam Underwood, English actor
 Phil Younghusband, British-Filipino footballer
 11 August 
 Adam Thomas, philanthropist
 Jemima West, Anglo-French actress  
 14 August 
 James Buckley, actor
 Nikki Kidd, Scottish field hockey forward
 15 August – Sean McAllister, footballer
 24 August – Ollie Hancock, racing driver
 3 September – Chris Fountain, actor
 4 September – Mike O'Shea, cricketer
 11 September – Elizabeth Henstridge, actress
 15 September – Christian Cooke, actor
 16 September – Kyle Lafferty, Northern Irish footballer
 17 September – Augustus Prew, actor
 22 September – Tom Felton, actor
 24 September – Matthew Connolly, footballer
 27 September – Luke Campbell, boxer
 4 October – Daniel Anthony, actor
 9 October – Samantha Murray, tennis player
 10 November – Andrew Koji, actor 
 14 November – Dimitri Leonidas, actor
 21 November – Aimee-Ffion Edwards, actress
 27 November – Lashana Lynch, actress
 28 November 
 Karen Gillan, actress and director
 Chloe Madeley, journalist and model
 30 November – Dougie Poynter, pop rock bassist (McFly)
 20 December – Winston Marshall, musician (Mumford & Sons)
 21 December – Rachel Shenton, actress
 22 December – Lisa Andreas, English singer of Cypriot descent
 25 December – Jorgie Porter, actress
 28 December – Hannah Tointon, actress

Deaths
 22 January – Ann Parker Bowles, socialite (born 1918)
 2 February
 Alistair MacLean, novelist (heart attack) (born 1922)
 Ken Reid, comic artist and writer (born 1919)
 4 February – Wynford Vaughan-Thomas, Welsh radio broadcaster (born 1908)
 19 February – Hugh Carleton Greene, television executive and journalist, Director-General of the BBC (1960–1969) (born 1910)
 28 February
 Joan Greenwood, actress (born 1921)
 Tom Stephenson, rambler (born 1893)
 Stephen Tennant, aristocrat (born 1906)
 7 March – Evelyn Dove, singer (born 1902)
 28 March – Patrick Troughton, actor (born 1920)
 2 April – Trevor Hockey, footballer (heart attack) (born 1943)
 4 April – Richard Aaron, philosopher (born 1901)
 8 April – Terry Allen, boxer (born 1924)
 26 April – John Silkin, politician (born 1923)
 22 May – Keidrych Rhys, Welsh poet and editor (born 1915)
 24 May – Hermione Gingold, actress (born 1897)
 6 June – Fulton Mackay, Scottish actor (born 1922)
 22 June – John Hewitt, poet (born 1907)
 29 August – Naji al-Ali, cartoonist, assassinated in London (born c. 1938 in Mandatory Palestine)
 4 September – Bill Bowes, cricketer (born 1908)
 11 September – Hugh David, television director (born 1925)
 17 September – Harry Locke, actor (born 1913)
 25 September – Emlyn Williams, Welsh dramatist and actor (born 1905)
 2 October – Peter Medawar, immunologist, recipient of Nobel Prize in Physiology or Medicine (born 1915 in Brazil)
 19 October – Jacqueline du Pré, cellist (born 1945)
 14 November – Roger Fleetwood-Hesketh, soldier and politician (born 1902)
 18 November – Colin Townsley, only firefighter killed in the King's Cross fire (born 1942)
 26 November – Duncan Sandys, politician, son-in-law of Winston Churchill (born 1908)
 22 December – Henry Cotton, golfer (born 1907)
 26 December – Melford Stevenson, judge (born 1902)

See also
 1987 in British music
 1987 in British television
 List of British films of 1987

References

 
Years of the 20th century in the United Kingdom
United Kingdom